The District of Gjilan is one of the seven districts (the higher-level administrative divisions) of Kosovo. Its seat is in the city of Gjilan.

History
Anamorava, literally "side of river of Morava", is the hilly countryside in south eastern Kosovo south of Gjilan and on the Binačka Morava. It stretches eastward to the Preševo (Presheva) valley in southern Serbia. The mountains in this region rise to an altitude of 1,000 to 1,200 meters, and culminate in the Skopska Crna Gora region bordering neighboring North Macedonia north of Skopje.

Municipalities 
The district of Gjilan has a total of 6 municipalities and 287 other smaller settlements:

Ethnic groups 

In 1991, all municipalities of the district had an Albanian majority: Gjilan (Gnjilane) (76.54%), Kamenica (Dardana) (73.05%), Vitina (Vitia) (78.68%).

In the 2011 census, after the creation of new municipalities with Serb population, Albanians are the majority in: Gjilan (Gnjilane) (97.4%), Kamenica (Dardana) (94.7%), Vitina (Vitia) (99.3%),and in Klokot (Kllokot) (53.3%).
Serbs are the majority in Parteš (Partesh) (99.9%) and in Ranilug (Ranillug) (99.9%). In Klokot they represent 46% of the population.

Ethnic groups in 2011 census:
The largest ethnic groups are Albanians and the biggest minority groups are Serbs.

See also
 Administrative divisions of Kosovo

Notes

References

External links

 
Districts of Kosovo